Richard Schell (May 15, 1810 – November 10, 1879) was an American politician who represented New York in the United States House of Representatives from 1874 to 1875.

Early life
Schell was born in Rhinebeck, New York on May 15, 1810.  He was the son of Christian Schell (1779–1825), a merchant, and Elizabeth (née Hughes) Schell (1783–1866).  He was the brother of Augustus Schell (1812–1884), Robert Schell (1815–1900), and Edward Schell (1819–1893), who were well-known business men of New York City.

His paternal grandparents were Richard Schell and Anna (née Schultz) Schell.

Career
He completed preparatory studies and engaged in mercantile pursuits before he moved to New York City in 1830 and became a wholesale dry-goods merchant. Schell was also an agent and lobbyist for Cornelius Vanderbilt.

Political career
He was a member of the New York State Senate (6th D.) in 1858 and 1859.

Schell was elected as a Democrat to the Forty-third Congress to fill the vacancy caused by the death of David B. Mellish and served from December 7, 1874, to March 3, 1875. After leaving Congress, he resumed mercantile pursuits.

Personal life
Schell was married to Helen Lott Jerome (1820–1890), the daughter of Aurora Murray (1785–1867) and Isaac Jerome (1786–1866).  She was also the sister of Leonard Jerome, the prominent financier, and the aunt of Jennie Jerome, an American who later became Lady Randolph Churchill when she married Lord Randolph Churchill, the parents of U.K. Prime Minister Winston Churchill.

Schell died in New York City in 1879, and was buried in the Old Dutch Cemetery in Rhinebeck.

In popular culture
In the 2012 film Lincoln, the character of Richard Schell was portrayed by actor Tim Blake Nelson.  He was shown lobbying for votes from Democratic House members to obtain passage of the Thirteenth Amendment to the United States Constitution.

References

External links

 

1810 births
1879 deaths
Democratic Party New York (state) state senators
Democratic Party members of the United States House of Representatives from New York (state)
19th-century American politicians